The Gospel of John is the fourth of the four canonical gospels. It contains a highly schematic account of the ministry of Jesus, with seven "signs" culminating in the raising of Lazarus (foreshadowing the resurrection of Jesus) and seven "I am" discourses (concerned with issues of the church–synagogue debate at the time of composition) culminating in Thomas' proclamation of the risen Jesus as "my Lord and my God". The gospel's concluding verses set out its purpose, "that you may believe that Jesus is the Christ, the Son of God, and that believing you may have life in his name."

It identifies an unnamed "disciple whom Jesus loved" as its author, which early church tradition regards as the Apostle John. Modern scholars, however, posit that the gospel was written anonymously and most likely arose within a "Johannine community," and – as it is closely related in style and content to the three Johannine epistles – most scholars treat the four books, along with the Book of Revelation, as a single corpus of Johannine literature, albeit not from the same author.

John reached its final form around AD 90–110, although it contains signs of origins dating back to AD 70 and possibly even earlier.

Authorship

Composition
John 21:22 references a disciple whom Jesus loved and John 21:24–25 says: "This is the disciple who is testifying to these things and has written them, and we know that his testimony is true; but there are also many other things that Jesus did; if all of them were written down, I suppose that the world itself would not contain the books that would be written." Early Christian tradition, which among extant writings is first noted in the writings of Irenaeus ( AD), identifies this disciple with John the Apostle, together with the Gnostics such as Ptolemy who, in his letter to Flora, quotes the Gospel and attributes it to an Apostle and Basilides who quotes John 1:9 and considers it a gospel. Irenaeus says that the gospel was composed by John during his residence at Ephesus to address the teachings of Cerinthus, who was regarded as a heresiarch in view of the early church fathers, as well as the teachings of the Ebionites.

Most modern scholars do not ascribe to this view or hold it only tenuously, arguing that the gospel is written in good Greek, displays sophisticated theology and is therefore unlikely to have been the work of a simple fisherman. They argue instead that the composition relies on the oral or written testimony of the "disciple who is testifying", as collected, preserved and reshaped by a community of followers, and that a single follower rearranged this material and perhaps added the final chapter and other passages to produce the final gospel. Some scholars hypothesize that the author may have drawn on a "signs source" (a collection of miracles) for chapters 1-12, a "passion source" for the story of Jesus's arrest and crucifixion, and a "sayings source" for the discourses, but these hypotheses are much debated. Recent arguments by Richard Bauckham and others that the Gospel of John preserves eyewitness testimony have not won general scholarly acceptance.

Most scholars estimate the final form of the text to be around AD 90–110. Given its complex history there may have been more than one place of composition, and while the author was familiar with Jewish customs and traditions, his frequent clarification of these implies that he wrote for a mixed Jewish/Gentile or Jewish context outside Palestine. The author seems to have known some version of Mark and Luke, as he shares with them some items of vocabulary and clusters of incidents arranged in the same order, but key terms from those gospels are absent or nearly so, implying that if he did know them he felt free to write independently. The Hebrew scriptures were an important source, with 14 direct quotations (versus 27 in Mark, 54 in Matthew, 24 in Luke), and their influence is vastly increased when allusions and echoes are included, but the majority of John's direct quotations do not agree exactly with any known version of the Jewish scriptures.

Setting: the Johannine community debate
For much of the 20th century, scholars interpreted the Gospel of John within the paradigm of a hypothetical "Johannine community", meaning that the gospel sprang from a late-1st-century Christian community excommunicated from the Jewish synagogue (probably meaning the Jewish community) on account of its belief in Jesus as the promised Jewish messiah. This interpretation, which saw the community as essentially sectarian and standing outside the mainstream of early Christianity, has been increasingly challenged in the first decades of the 21st century, and there is currently considerable debate over the social, religious and historical context of the gospel. Nevertheless, the Johannine literature as a whole (made up of the gospel, the three Johannine epistles, and Revelation), points to a community holding itself distinct from the Jewish culture from which it arose while cultivating an intense devotion to Jesus as the definitive revelation of a God with whom they were in close contact through the Paraclete.

Structure and content

The majority of scholars see four sections in the Gospel of John: a prologue (1:1–18); an account of the ministry, often called the "Book of Signs" (1:19–12:50); the account of Jesus' final night with his disciples and the passion and resurrection, sometimes called the Book of Glory (13:1–20:31); and a conclusion (20:30–31); to these is added an epilogue which most scholars believe did not form part of the original text (Chapter 21). Disagreement does exist; some scholars such as Richard Bauckham argue that John 21 was part of the original work, for example.
The prologue informs readers of the true identity of Jesus, the Word of God through whom the world was created and who took on human form; he came to the Jews and the Jews rejected him, but "to all who received him (the circle of Christian believers), who believed in his name, he gave power to become children of God." 
Book of Signs (ministry of Jesus): Jesus calls his disciples and begins his earthly ministry. He travels from place to place informing his hearers about God the Father in long discourses, offering eternal life to all who will believe, and performing miracles which are signs of the authenticity of his teachings, but this creates tensions with the religious authorities (manifested as early as 5:17–18), who decide that he must be eliminated. 
The Book of Glory tells of Jesus's return to his heavenly father: it tells how he prepares his disciples for their coming lives without his physical presence and his prayer for himself and for them, followed by his betrayal, arrest, trial, crucifixion and post-resurrection appearances. 
The conclusion sets out the purpose of the gospel, which is "that you may believe that Jesus is the Christ, the Son of God, and that believing you may have life in his name."
Chapter 21, the addendum, tells of Jesus' post-resurrection appearances in Galilee, the miraculous catch of fish, the prophecy of the crucifixion of Peter, and the fate of the Beloved Disciple.

The structure is highly schematic: there are seven "signs" culminating in the raising of Lazarus (foreshadowing the resurrection of Jesus), and seven "I am" sayings and discourses, culminating in Thomas's proclamation of the risen Jesus as "my Lord and my God" (the same title, claimed by the Emperor Domitian, an indication of the date of composition).

Theology

Christology

Scholars agree that while John clearly regards Jesus as divine, he just as clearly subordinates him to the one God. According to James Dunn, this Christology view in John, does not describe a subordinationist relation, but rather the authority and validity of the Son's "revelation" of the Father, the continuity between the Father and the Son. Dunn sees this view as intended to serve the Logos Christology, while others (e.g., Andrew Loke) see it as connected to the incarnation theme in John. The idea of the Trinity developed only slowly through the merger of Hebrew monotheism and the idea of the messiah, Greek ideas of the relationship between God, the world, and the mediating Saviour, and the Egyptian concept of the three-part divinity. However, while the developed doctrine of the Trinity is not explicit in the books that constitute the New Testament, the New Testament possesses a triadic understanding of God and contains a number of Trinitarian formulas. John's "high Christology" depicts Jesus as divine and pre-existent, defends him against Jewish claims that he was "making himself equal to God", and talks openly about his divine role and echoing Yahweh's "I Am that I Am" with seven "I Am" declarations of his own.

Logos

In the prologue, the gospel identifies Jesus as the Logos or Word. In Ancient Greek philosophy, the term  meant the principle of cosmic reason. In this sense, it was similar to the Hebrew concept of Wisdom, God's companion and intimate helper in creation. The Hellenistic Jewish philosopher Philo merged these two themes when he described the Logos as God's creator of and mediator with the material world. According to Stephen Harris, the gospel adapted Philo's description of the Logos, applying it to Jesus, the incarnation of the Logos.

Another possibility is that the title  is based on the concept of the divine Word found in the Targums (Aramaic translation/interpretations recited in the synagogue after the reading of the Hebrew Scriptures). In the Targums (which all post-date the first century but which give evidence of preserving early material), the concept of the divine Word was used in a manner similar to Philo, namely, for God's interaction with the world (starting from creation) and especially with his people, e.g.

Cross
The portrayal of Jesus' death in John is unique among the four Gospels. It does not appear to rely on the kinds of atonement theology indicative of vicarious sacrifice but rather presents the death of Jesus as his glorification and return to the Father. Likewise, the three "passion predictions" of the Synoptic Gospels are replaced instead in John with three instances of Jesus explaining how he will be exalted or "lifted up". The verb for "lifted up" reflects the double entendre at work in John's theology of the cross, for Jesus is both physically elevated from the earth at the crucifixion but also, at the same time, exalted and glorified.

Sacraments

Scholars disagree both on whether and how frequently John refers to sacraments, but current scholarly opinion is that there are very few such possible references, and that if they exist they are limited to baptism and the Eucharist. In fact, there is no institution of the Eucharist in John's account of the Last Supper (it is replaced with Jesus washing the feet of his disciples), and no New Testament text that unambiguously links baptism with rebirth.

Individualism
In comparison to the synoptic gospels, the fourth gospel is markedly individualistic, in the sense that it places emphasis more on the individual's relation to Jesus than on the corporate nature of the Church. This is largely accomplished through the consistently singular grammatical structure of various aphoristic sayings of Jesus throughout the gospel. Emphasis on believers coming into a new group upon their conversion is conspicuously absent from John, and there is a theme of "personal coinherence", that is, the intimate personal relationship between the believer and Jesus in which the believer "abides" in Jesus and Jesus in the believer. The individualistic tendencies of John could potentially give rise to a realized eschatology achieved on the level of the individual believer; this realized eschatology is not, however, to replace "orthodox", futurist eschatological expectations, but is to be "only [their] correlative."

John the Baptist

John's account of John the Baptist is different from that of the synoptic gospels. In this gospel, John is not called "the Baptist." The Baptist's ministry overlaps with that of Jesus; his baptism of Jesus is not explicitly mentioned, but his witness to Jesus is unambiguous. The evangelist almost certainly knew the story of John's baptism of Jesus and he makes a vital theological use of it. He subordinates the Baptist to Jesus, perhaps in response to members of the Baptist's sect who regarded the Jesus movement as an offshoot of their movement.

In the Gospel of John, Jesus and his disciples go to Judea early in Jesus' ministry before John the Baptist was imprisoned and executed by Herod. He leads a ministry of baptism larger than John's own. The Jesus Seminar rated this account as black, containing no historically accurate information. According to the biblical historians at the Jesus Seminar, John likely had a larger presence in the public mind than Jesus.

Gnosticism

In the first half of the 20th century, many scholars, primarily including Rudolph Bultmann, forcefully argued that the Gospel of John has elements in common with Gnosticism. Christian Gnosticism did not fully develop until the mid-2nd century, and so 2nd-century Proto-Orthodox Christians concentrated much effort in examining and refuting it. To say the Gospel of John contained elements of Gnosticism is to assume that Gnosticism had developed to a level that required the author to respond to it. Bultmann, for example, argued that the opening theme of the Gospel of John, the pre-existing Logos, along with John's duality of light versus darkness in the Gospel were originally Gnostic themes that John adopted. Other scholars (e.g., Raymond E. Brown) have argued that the pre-existing Logos theme arises from the more ancient Jewish writings in the eighth chapter of the Book of Proverbs, and was fully developed as a theme in Hellenistic Judaism by Philo Judaeus. The discovery of the Dead Sea Scrolls at Qumran verified the Jewish nature of these concepts. April DeConick has suggested reading John 8:56 in support of a Gnostic theology, however recent scholarship has cast doubt on her reading.

Gnostics read John but interpreted it differently from the way non-Gnostics did. Gnosticism taught that salvation came from gnosis, secret knowledge, and Gnostics did not see Jesus as a savior but a revealer of knowledge. The gospel teaches that salvation can only be achieved through revealed wisdom, specifically belief in (literally belief ) Jesus. John's picture of a supernatural savior who promised to return to take those who believed in him to a heavenly dwelling could be fitted into Gnostic view. It has been suggested that similarities between the Gospel of John and Gnosticism may spring from common roots in Jewish Apocalyptic literature.

Comparison with other writings

Synoptic gospels and Pauline literature
The Gospel of John is significantly different from the synoptic gospels in the selection of its material, its theological emphasis, its chronology, and literary style, with some of its discrepancies amounting to contradictions. The following are some examples of their differences in just one area, that of the material they include in their narratives:

In the Synoptics, the ministry of Jesus takes a single year, but in John it takes three, as evidenced by references to three Passovers. Events are not all in the same order: the date of the crucifixion is different, as is the time of Jesus' anointing in Bethany and the cleansing of the Temple, which occurs in the beginning of Jesus' ministry rather than near its end.

Many incidents from John, such as the wedding in Cana, the encounter of Jesus with the Samaritan woman at the well, and the raising of Lazarus, are not paralleled in the synoptics, and most scholars believe the author drew these from an independent source called the "signs gospel", the speeches of Jesus from a second "discourse" source, and the prologue from an early hymn. The gospel makes extensive use of the Jewish scriptures: John quotes from them directly, references important figures from them, and uses narratives from them as the basis for several of the discourses. The author was also familiar with non-Jewish sources: the Logos of the prologue (the Word that is with God from the beginning of creation), for example, was derived from both the Jewish concept of Lady Wisdom and from the Greek philosophers, John 6 alludes not only to the exodus but also to Greco-Roman mystery cults, and John 4 alludes to Samaritan messianic beliefs.

John lacks scenes from the Synoptics such as Jesus' baptism, the calling of the Twelve, exorcisms, parables, and the Transfiguration. Conversely, it includes scenes not found in the Synoptics, including Jesus turning water into wine at the wedding at Cana, the resurrection of Lazarus, Jesus washing the feet of his disciples, and multiple visits to Jerusalem.

In the fourth gospel, Jesus' mother Mary is mentioned in three passages, but not named. John does assert that Jesus was known as the "son of Joseph" in 6:42. For John, Jesus' town of origin is irrelevant, for he comes from beyond this world, from God the Father.

While John makes no direct mention of Jesus' baptism, he does quote John the Baptist's description of the descent of the Holy Spirit as a dove, as happens at Jesus' baptism in the Synoptics. Major synoptic speeches of Jesus are absent, including the Sermon on the Mount and the Olivet Discourse, and the exorcisms of demons are never mentioned as in the Synoptics. John never lists all of the Twelve Disciples and names at least one disciple, Nathanael, whose name is not found in the Synoptics. Thomas is given a personality beyond a mere name, described as "Doubting Thomas".

In Mark, Jesus urges his disciples to keep his divinity secret, but in John he is very open in discussing it, even referring to himself as "I AM", the title God gives himself in Exodus at his self-revelation to Moses. In the Synoptics, the chief theme is the Kingdom of God and the Kingdom of Heaven (the latter specifically in Matthew), while John's theme is Jesus as the source of eternal life and the Kingdom is only mentioned twice. In contrast to the synoptic expectation of the Kingdom (using the term , meaning "coming"), John presents a more individualistic, realized eschatology.

In the Synoptics, quotations from Jesus are usually in the form of short, pithy sayings; in John, longer quotations are often given. The vocabulary is also different, and filled with theological import: in John, Jesus does not work "miracles", but "signs"  which unveil his divine identity. Most scholars consider John not to contain any parables. Rather it contains metaphorical stories or allegories, such as those of the Good Shepherd and of the True Vine, in which each individual element corresponds to a specific person, group, or thing. Other scholars consider stories like the childbearing woman or the dying grain to be parables.

According to the Synoptics, the arrest of Jesus was a reaction to the cleansing of the temple, while according to John it was triggered by the raising of Lazarus. The Pharisees, portrayed as more uniformly legalistic and opposed to Jesus in the synoptic gospels, are instead portrayed as sharply divided; they debate frequently in John's accounts. Some, such as Nicodemus, even go so far as to be at least partially sympathetic to Jesus. This is believed to be a more accurate historical depiction of the Pharisees, who made debate one of the tenets of their system of belief.

In place of the communal emphasis of the Pauline literature, John stresses the personal relationship of the individual to God.

Johannine literature
The Gospel of John and the three Johannine epistles exhibit strong resemblances in theology and style; the Book of Revelation has also been traditionally linked with these, but differs from the gospel and letters in style and even theology. The letters were written later than the gospel, and while the gospel reflects the break between the Johannine Christians and the Jewish synagogue, in the letters the Johannine community itself is disintegrating ("They went out from us, but they were not of us; for if they had been of us, they would have continued with us; but they went out..." - 1 John 2:19). This secession was over Christology, the "knowledge of Christ", or more accurately the understanding of Christ's nature, for the ones who "went out" hesitated to identify Jesus with Christ, minimising the significance of the earthly ministry and denying the salvific importance of Jesus's death on the cross. The epistles argue against this view, stressing the eternal existence of the Son of God, the salvific nature of his life and death, and the other elements of the gospel's "high" Christology.

Historical reliability

Jesus' teachings in the Synoptics greatly differ from those in the fourth gospel. Since the 19th century, scholars have almost unanimously accepted that the Johannine discourses are less likely to be historical than the synoptic parables, and were likely written for theological purposes. Nevertheless, scholars generally agree that the fourth gospel is not without historical value. Some potential points of value include early provenance for some Johannine material, topographical references for Jerusalem and Judea, Jesus' crucifixion occurring prior to the Feast of Unleavened Bread, and Jesus' arrest in the garden occurring after the accompanying deliberation of Jewish authorities.

Representations

The gospel has been depicted in live narrations and dramatized in productions, skits, plays, and Passion Plays, as well as in film. The most recent such portrayal is the 2014 film The Gospel of John, directed by David Batty and narrated by David Harewood and Brian Cox, with Selva Rasalingam as Jesus. The 2003 film The Gospel of John was directed by Philip Saville and narrated by Christopher Plummer, with Henry Ian Cusick as Jesus.

Parts of the gospel have been set to music. One such setting is Steve Warner's power anthem "Come and See", written for the 20th anniversary of the Alliance for Catholic Education and including lyrical fragments taken from the Book of Signs. Additionally, some composers have made settings of the Passion as portrayed in the gospel, most notably St John Passion composed by Johann Sebastian Bach, although some verses are borrowed from Matthew.

See also

Notes

References

Citations

Sources

 
 
 
 

 
 

 
 
  
 
 
 
 
 
 
 

 
 
 
 
 
 
 
 
 
 
 
 
 
 
 
 
 

 
 
 
 
 
 
 

 
 
 
 
 
 
 
 
 
 
 
 
 

 
 
 
 
 
 
 
 
 
 
 
 
 

 
 
 
 
 
 
 
 
 
 
 
 
 
 *

External links
Online translations of the Gospel of John:
 Over 200 versions in over 70 languages at Bible Gateway
 The Unbound Bible from Biola University
 David Robert Palmer, Translation from the Greek
 Text of the Gospel with textual variants
 The Egerton Gospel text; compare with Gospel of John
 Online version of Book of John, KJV 

 
1st-century Christian texts
2nd-century Christian texts
Catharism
Johannine literature
John
Texts in Koine Greek
Works of uncertain authorship